Khairallah Abdelkbir (born 20 September 1983) is a Moroccan-born Indonesian professional footballer who plays as a midfielder for Liga 2 club Persekat Tegal.

Club career
At the age of six, Abdelkbir entered the Raja Casablanca youth academy. However, he fought with his mother because she disapproved of football and wanted him to get into college. Eventually, she supported him when he started earning money from the sport.

In 2018, while a free agent, Abdelkbir played in a village tournament (Tarkam) and stated that the competition was harder than the Super League because the amateur players go harder against professionals. He has also stated that the public interest in football in Indonesia was extremely high.

After leaving Bhayangkara in 2016, he has not featured in the league for any Indonesian club. Despite this, he has trialed for a few teams, including Madura United in 2017 and PSS Sleman in 2019.

Persis Solo
He was signed for Persis Solo to play in the Liga 2 in the 2021 season. Abdelkbir made his debut on 12 October 2021 in a match against PSIM Yogyakarta at the Manahan Stadium, Surakarta.

Sriwijaya
In November 2021, Abdelkbir signed a contract with Liga 1 club Sriwijaya in the second round of 2021 Liga 2 (Indonesia). He made his league debut in a 2–0 win against Muba Babel United on 4 November 2021 as a substitute for Afriansyah in the 67th minute at the Kaharudin Nasution Rumbai Stadium, Pekanbaru.

Career statistics

References

External links
 
 Khairallah Abdelkbir at Liga Indonesia

Moroccan footballers
Living people
Association football midfielders
Association football forwards
1983 births
ES Métlaoui players
Wydad de Fès players
Naturalised citizens of Indonesia
Moroccan emigrants to Indonesia
Indonesian people of Moroccan descent
Bhayangkara F.C. players
Persis Solo players
Sriwijaya F.C. players